George Latimer Apperson ISO, (1857–1937) was a school inspector and man of letters.

He was editor of The Antiquary from 1899–1915, and a major contributor to the Oxford English Dictionary, both submitting large numbers of quotations and serving as subeditor for parts.

Apperson was created Companion of the Imperial Service Order in 1903, for his service in the Scotch Education Department within the Scottish Office at Whitehall.

Works
The following list has come from a search on the Jisc Library Hub Discover database., with details checked by looking at advertisements and reviews for the works at the time of publication in the British Newspaper Archive.

Notes

References

External links
 
 
 

1857 births
1937 deaths
British lexicographers
British writers
Companions of the Imperial Service Order